Bugga Ramalingeswara Swamy temple is a Siva shrine situated on the southern bank of the Penna river in Tadipatri, Anantapur district of Andhra Pradesh, India. It was built between 1490 and 1509 by Pemmasani Ramalinga Nayudu I, a Pemmasani Nayaka chieftain of the Gutti-Gandikota region during the reign of the Vijayanagara Empire. 

The presiding deity is a linga, considered to be ‘swayambhu’ (naturally occurring or self originated). The temple has seven small independent pillars in front of the Vishnu shrine and when struck they produce 'saptaswara' (the seven musical notes). The gopurams of the temple are unfinished and were described by architectural historian James Anderson as ‘wonders’.

Description 
It was likely built between 1490 and 1509 during the reign of the Vijayanagara Empire. As per the Tadipatri kaifiyat collected by Colin Mackenzie in 1802, the temple was built by Ramalinga Nayudu, a chieftain of the Gutti-Gandikota region in Vijayanagara Empire.

The temple consists of a sanctum, ardhmandapa, and mukhamandapa in an axial line. The temple contains bas relief structures illustrating episodes from Ramayana and Mahabharata. The presiding deity (linga) being a ‘swayambhu’ (naturally occurring or self originated). Unlike other Hindu temples where the deities are east-facing, in this temple the Shiva linga faces west. When struck, the seven pillars in front of the Vishnu shrine produce 'saptaswara' (a musical scale).

The architectural historian James Anderson described the gopurams of this temple as ‘wonders’.

Gallery

References

External links

https://www.inrootz.in/historic-places/religious-spiritual-temples/pl60/Bugga-Ramalingeswara-Temple-Tadipatri-Anantapur

Hindu temples in Anantapur district
15th-century architecture
16th-century architecture